Hawaiian Airlines is the largest operator of commercial flights to and from the U.S. state of Hawaii. It is the tenth-largest commercial airline in the United States, and is based at Honolulu, Hawaii. The airline operates its main hub at Daniel K. Inouye International Airport on the island of Oʻahu and a secondary hub out of Kahului Airport on the island of Maui. The airline also maintained a crew base at Los Angeles International Airport. Hawaiian Airlines operates flights to Asia, American Samoa, Australia, French Polynesia, Hawaii, New Zealand, and the United States mainland. Hawaiian Airlines is owned by Hawaiian Holdings, Inc. of which Peter R. Ingram is the current president and chief executive officer.

Hawaiian is the oldest American carrier that has never had a fatal accident or a hull loss throughout its history, and frequently tops the on-time carrier list in the United States, as well as the fewest cancellations, oversales, and baggage handling issues.

History

Early years (1929–1984) 

Inter-Island Airways, the forerunner of the airline which is now known as Hawaiian Airlines, was incorporated on January 30, 1929. Inter-Island Airways, a subsidiary of Inter-Island Steam Navigation Company, began operations on October 6, 1929, with a Bellanca CH-300 Pacemaker, providing short sightseeing flights over Oʻahu. Scheduled service began a month later on November 11 using Sikorsky S-38s with a flight from Honolulu to Hilo, via intermediary stops on Molokaʻi and Maui.

On October 1, 1941, the name was changed to Hawaiian Airlines when the company phased out the older Sikorsky S-38 and Sikorsky S-43 flying boats. The first Douglas DC-3s were added to the fleet in August 1941, some examples remaining in operation until final retirement in November 1968.

Modern pressurized equipment was introduced from 1952 in the form of the Convair 340. Further Convair 440s were added in 1959–60, most of the Convairs being converted to turbine propeller power in 1965–67. The last were sold in 1974.

Hawaiian Airlines started to offer jet service in 1966 with the acquisition of Douglas DC-9-10 aircraft, which cut travel times in half on most of its routes.

Growth outside Hawaii (1984–1994) 
Hawaiian Airlines began to expand its footprint throughout the 1980s, as the result of intense competition on inter-island routes created by the entrance of Mid Pacific Air into the market. In 1985, the company began its first foray outside the inter-island market through charter services to the South Pacific and then throughout the rest of the Pacific using Douglas DC-8 aircraft. Despite the early successes of this new business, Hawaiian was forced to curtail its charter services when the Federal Government banned all DC-8 and B707 aircraft without hush kits from operating within the US. Hawaiian did, however, manage to gain a short exemption for its South Pacific services.

Soon after, in early 1985, the company received the first two of its leased Lockheed L-1011 TriStars. One aircraft was used to launch Hawaiian's first scheduled operation out of Hawaiʻi, daily Honolulu-Los Angeles services. This new service put Hawaiian in direct competition with the major US air carriers for the first time in its history. Throughout 1985 and 1986, Hawaiian Airlines added additional L-1011s to its fleet and used them to open up services to other West Coast gateway cities such as San Francisco, Seattle, Portland, Las Vegas, and Anchorage, which placed Hawaiian in further competition against the major US airlines.

Meanwhile, Hawaiian Airlines also entered the new international markets of Australia and New Zealand in 1986 with one-stop services through Pago Pago International Airport. Hawaiian also aggressively grew its international charter business and pursued military transport contracts. This led to a large growth in the company's revenues and caused its inter-island service's share of revenues to shrink to just about a third of the company's total.

During the 1980s, Hawaiian also embarked on the development and construction of Kapalua Airport on west side of Maui. Opened in 1987, the airport was designed with a 3,000-foot runway, which constrained its ability to handle large aircraft. As a result, when the airport first opened, Hawaiian Airlines was the only inter-island carrier with aircraft capable of serving the airport. With its de Havilland Canada DHC-7 Dash 7 turboprops, Hawaiian had a distinct competitive advantage in the Maui market.

Heading into the 1990s, Hawaiian Airlines faced financial difficulties, racking up millions of dollars in losses throughout the previous three years. Due to the airline's increasingly unprofitable operations, it filed for Chapter 11 bankruptcy protection in September 1993. During this time, the company reduced many of its costs: reorganizing its debt, wrestling concessions from employees, cutting overcapacity, and streamlining its fleet by disposing many of the planes it had added to its fleet just a few years earlier.

As part of Hawaiian's restructuring, it sold Kapalua Airport to the State of Hawaii in 1993. Hawaiian soon after discontinued service to the airport as it retired its Dash 7 fleet. The retirement of the Dash 7 in 1994 also resulted in the airline operating a more streamlined all-jet fleet as it exited bankruptcy in September 1994.

All jet fleet (1994–2003) 

To replace its retired DC-8s and L-1011s, Hawaiian Airlines leased six DC-10s from American Airlines, who continued to provide maintenance on the aircraft. An agreement with American also included participation in American's SABRE reservation system and participation in American Airlines' AAdvantage frequent flyer program. The DC-10s were subsequently retired between 2002 and 2003. The company replaced these leased DC-10s with 14 leased Boeing 767 aircraft during a fleet modernization program that also replaced its DC-9s with new Boeing 717 aircraft. The Boeing aircraft featured an updated rendition of the company's "Pualani" tail art, which had appeared on its Douglas aircraft since the 1970s. A new design was updated by a local artist Mauriel Morejon. Pualani, which means “flower of the sky,” the key icon of Hawaiian's brand for more than four decades, continues to feature on the tail of the aircraft; beneath her, a silver maile lei with woven pakalana flowers wraps around the fuselage.

Second bankruptcy and reorganization (2003–2005) 
In March 2003, Hawaiian Airlines filed for Chapter 11 bankruptcy protection for the second time in its history. The airline continued its normal operations, and at the time was overdue for $4.5 million worth of payments to the pilots' pension plan. Within the company, it was suggested that the plan be terminated. As of May 2005, Hawaiian Airlines had received court approval of its reorganization plan. The company emerged from bankruptcy protection on June 2, 2005, with reduced operating costs through renegotiated contracts with its union work groups; restructured aircraft leases; and investment from RC Aviation, a unit of San Diego-based Ranch Capital, which bought a majority share in parent company Hawaiian Holdings Inc in 2004.

Post-bankruptcy (2005–2012) 
On October 1, 2005, Hawaiian Airlines began nonstop daily flights from Honolulu to San Jose, California. This made San Jose the fifth gateway city in California to be serviced by Hawaiian; the others were Los Angeles, San Diego, Sacramento, and San Francisco.

On May 4, 2006, Hawaiian Airlines expanded service between the US mainland and Hawaii in anticipation of the induction of four additional Boeing 767-300 aircraft, primarily focused on expanding non-stop service to Kahului Airport from San Diego, Seattle, and Portland. Additional flights were also added between Honolulu and the cities of Sacramento, Seattle, and Los Angeles. In 2006, Hawaiian Airlines was rated as the best carrier serving Hawaii by Travel + Leisure, Zagat and Condé Nast Traveler.

On July 24, 2007, Hawaiian Airlines and Air New Zealand signed a $45 million contract for Air New Zealand to perform heavy maintenance on Hawaiian's Boeing 767 aircraft. This contract lasted for five years. Air New Zealand stated that this opportunity will also give a chance for them to build their expertise working on 767s. In August 2007, the Seattle Seahawks became the second sports team to begin using Hawaiian Airlines to travel to games. The Las Vegas Raiders, also of the NFL, have been flying Hawaiian Airlines since the 1990s. The two teams formerly flew on Hawaiian's Boeing 767s to and from all their games, but now travel on Hawaiian's Airbus A330s. Several of Hawaiian's Boeing 767 and A330 aircraft have been fitted with decals of logos of the Raiders.

In March 2008, the airline launched nonstop flights to Manila, capital of Philippines, in the airline's first major international expansion since it emerged from bankruptcy protection in June 2005. In response to the closure of ATA Airlines and Aloha Airlines, the airline began flights to Oakland on May 1, 2008.

On February 16, 2010, Hawaiian Airlines sought approval from the United States Department of Transportation to begin nonstop flights from its hub at Honolulu to Tokyo-Haneda sometime in 2010. The airline was one of five US carriers — the others being Delta Air Lines, Continental Airlines, United Airlines and American Airlines — seeking approval to serve Haneda as part of the U.S.-Japan OpenSkies agreement. Approval was granted from USDOT to begin nonstop service to Haneda, Japan. The flight began service on November 18, 2010. In addition, the airline is planning to establish a codeshare agreement with All Nippon Airways.

On January 12, 2011, Hawaiian Airlines began nonstop service to Seoul-Incheon, South Korea. On March 31, 2011, Hawaiian announced that they will be renovating the check-in lobby of the inter-island terminal at the Honolulu International Airport (Hawaiian's main hub). Hawaiian, the only occupant of the inter-island terminal, will be removing the traditional check-in counter, to install six circular check-in islands in the middle of the lobbies. Those check-in islands can be used for inter-island, mainland, and international flights. On July 12, 2011, Hawaiian added Osaka, Japan to its network. On November 17, 2011, Hawaiian ordered five additional Airbus A330-200 aircraft.

On June 4, 2012, Hawaiian expanded to the east coast with daily flights to New York's John F. Kennedy International Airport. On August 30, 2012, Hawaiian filed an application with the U.S. Department of Transportation for a nonstop route between Kona and Tokyo-Haneda. This would fill a void that Japan Airlines left when it ceased service to Kona nearly two years earlier. However, the US Department of Transportation rejected the airline's application to begin service. On December 3, 2012, the airline unveiled plans to begin flights to Taipei, Taiwan (Republic of China) beginning July 9, 2013, as part of its aggressive expansion plans.

Further expansion and new subsidiary carrier (2013–present) 
On February 11, 2013, the airline announced a new venture in the turboprop interisland business, "ʻOhana by Hawaiian." Service is operated by Empire Airlines using ATR 42-500 turboprop airplanes. Service began on March 11, 2014, to Molokaʻi and Lānaʻi. The airline expanded more "ʻOhana by Hawaiian" routes between Kahului, Kailua-Kona and Hilo during the summer of 2014. On April 10, 2013, the airline announced its first destination in China, with service to Beijing expected to start on April 16, 2014, pending government approval. At the same time, the airline announced that it would end service to Manila capital of Philippines on July 31, 2013. On July 11, 2013, the airline signed a codeshare agreement with China Airlines.

On March 12, 2014, Hawaiian announced that it would begin daily service between Kahului and Los Angeles on May 2, adding a second flight from June 30 to September 8 in response to passenger demand. It would also begin nonstop summer service between Los Angeles and both Līhuʻe, Kauaʻi and Kona, Hawaiʻi.
On August 14, 2014, the airline announced direct service between Kahului and San Francisco beginning in November.

On January 5, 2015, Hawaiian refiled its previously rejected application with the U.S. Department of Transportation (DOT) for the Kona-Haneda route with service, if approved, to begin in June. The request was prompted by a DOT decision in December 2014 to review the public interest in Delta Air Lines' Seattle-Tokyo route after Delta reduced the frequency of those flights from daily to seasonal. On March 31, DOT again denied the request, opting instead to allow Delta to continue operating the route, with American Airlines taking over if Delta's planned service continued to fail.

On May 1, 2017, the airline revealed a new logo and livery for its aircraft.

On March 6, 2018, the airline announced an order for 10 Boeing 787-9 Dreamliners with options for an additional ten; selecting GE GEnx engines. An order for an additional two 787-9 aircraft was announced on January 4, 2023.

Due to the economic effects of the COVID-19 pandemic, Hawaiian Airlines reported a net loss of over $100 million for the Q2 of 2020.

Fourteen-day travel quarantines, which were reinstated for August 2020 have also contributed to Hawaiian Airlines' plans to downsize the company by 15-25% by summer 2021.

On May 27, 2021, Hawaiian announced that it would discontinue the ʻOhana by Hawaiian brand and its cargo and passenger services after the pandemic and resulting quarantine significantly impacted interisland travel. The interruptions in service forced the airline to reconsider the viability of operation and determine it was no longer feasible. The carrier's ATR fleet would be moved to the mainland and be prepared for sale.

On April 25, 2022, Hawaiian Airlines announced they will become the first major air carrier to offer the SpaceX Starlink service on all Transpacific flights. The service will be offered free to passengers beginning in 2023.

Corporate affairs

Ownership and structure 
The parent company of Hawaiian Airlines, Inc. is Hawaiian Holdings, Inc. (NASDAQ: HA)
Previously listed on the American Stock Exchange, the company moved to NASDAQ on June 2, 2008. Hawaiian Holdings, Inc. is a holding company whose primary asset is the sole ownership of all issued and outstanding shares of common stock of Hawaiian Airlines, Inc. On June 30, 2008, the company announced that it had been added to the Russell 3000 Index.

Business trends 

Recent key figures for Hawaiian Holdings, Inc. (which include the operations of Hawaiian Airlines and former regional subsidiary carrier ʻOhana by Hawaiian) are shown below (for years ending December 31):

Destinations 

Hawaiian Airlines serves destinations in several Asia-Pacific countries and territories. The airline added its eighth international destination, Incheon International Airport near Seoul, South Korea on January 12, 2011. It also has daily and weekly direct, non-stop international flights from Honolulu to Tahiti, Australia, South Korea, Japan, and New Zealand.

Codeshare agreements 
Hawaiian Airlines codeshares with the following airlines:

 Air China
 American Airlines
 China Airlines
 Delta Air Lines
 Japan Airlines
 JetBlue
 Korean Air
 Philippine Airlines
 Turkish Airlines
 United Airlines
 Virgin Australia

Interline agreement 
Hawaiian Airlines has an interline agreement with South African Airways. It also has a cargo interline agreement with Southwest Airlines.

Fleet 
, the Hawaiian Airlines fleet consists of the following aircraft:

The airline names its Boeing 717 aircraft after birds found in Polynesia, their Airbus A330 aircraft after Polynesian constellations historically used to navigate to the Hawaiian islands, and their Airbus A321neo fleet after plants and forests within the Hawaiian islands.

Inter-island fleet

Boeing 717 

Hawaiian began acquiring Boeing 717 aircraft for operation on the neighbor Island network in February 2001. On June 4, 2008, the airline announced that it had agreed to lease an additional four 717 airplanes to meet demand due to the shutdown of Aloha Airlines' passenger operations and the closing of ATA Airlines, with deliveries between September and the end of 2008.

Airbus A321neo 
Hawaiian Airlines started sending an A321neo aircraft on a route from Honolulu to Kahului, and Kahului to Honolulu in January 2020.  This route ran four times a week; as of August 2020, the route is flown every day. This route is operated under HA179 (OGG – HNL) and HA180 (HNL – OGG). Various inter-island flights from Honolulu to Lihue, Kahului, Kona, and Hilo can be found on the A321 NEO post pandemic. Some are used as aircraft positioning flights while others turn around and head back to Honolulu.

Airbus A330-200 
In 2022, Hawaiian Airlines began regularly scheduled inter-island service on the A330-200 between Honolulu and Kahului. Occasionally, the A330 can be found on flights between Honolulu and Kona.

Medium and long-haul fleet

Airbus A321neo 

In January 2013, Hawaiian signed a memorandum of understanding with Airbus for an order of 16 A321neo aircraft plus up to 9 options. The aircraft is operated in a 2-class, 189 seat configuration. Following the completion of labor agreements relating to the operation of the aircraft with the airline's pilot and flight attendant unions, the airline finalized the order in March 2013. In December 2016, Hawaiian announced their intention of leasing two additional A321neo aircraft, bringing their total fleet of the type to 18. The first flight took place on January 17, 2018, from Kahului to Oakland, California.

Airbus A330-200 

On November 27, 2007, Hawaiian Airlines signed a memorandum of understanding with Airbus for 24 long-range jets priced at $4.4 billion. The order included six Airbus A330-200s with a further six purchase rights and six Airbus A350-800s with a further six purchase rights. Plans to fly to Paris and London were discussed. Deliveries for the A330s began in 2010 while the first A350 was to be delivered in 2017. Upon the cancellation of A350-800 development, Hawaiian opted for six A330-800s instead.

On October 27, 2008, Hawaiian announced that, prior to the arrival of its new A330s, it would lease two additional Airbus A330-200 aircraft, beginning in 2011, at the same time extending the leases of two Boeing 767-300ER aircraft to 2011 (to be withdrawn from service coincident with the delivery of the A330s). Two weeks later, the airline announced the lease of an additional A330-200 for delivery in the second quarter of 2010, and negotiated for delivery of one aircraft from the earlier lease agreement to be moved up to the same quarter. In December 2010, Hawaiian ordered an additional six A330-200 aircraft, bringing the fleet total to 15. Further lease agreements were signed with Air Lease Corporation (one aircraft), and three aircraft each from Hong Kong Aviation Capital and Jackson Square Aviation, bringing the A330-200 fleet to twenty-two. In July 2015, Hawaiian announced the lease of an A330-200 from Air Lease Corporation. The purchase of another A330-200 was announced in December 2016.

Boeing 787-9 
In February 2018, Hawaiian was rumored to be canceling its order for six A330-800s and replacing them with 787-9s. It was reported that Boeing priced the aircraft at less than $115 million, and possibly less than $100 million, each; the production cost of a 787-9 is between $80 million and $90 million. Boeing Capital also released Hawaiian from three 767-300ER leases in advance; these aircraft were to be transferred to United Airlines. Initially, Hawaiian refuted it cancelled its A330-800 order, but did not dismiss a new deal with Boeing. However, on March 6, 2018, Hawaiian Airlines confirmed the cancellation of the A330-800 order and the signing of a Letter of Intent with Boeing to purchase ten 787-9 aircraft, with options for an additional ten planes; the deal was finalized at the Farnborough Air Show in July 2018. Hawaiian announced on January 4, 2023 that two additional 787-9 aircraft would be added to its order (for a total of 12 787-9 aircraft on order) as part of a deal with Boeing to defer deliveries to the fourth quarter of 2023.

Historical fleet 
Throughout its history, Hawaiian Airlines has operated a diverse range of aircraft including the following:

Services

In-flight services

Cabins 
In late 2014, Hawaiian Airlines began offering Extra Comfort seating, as a new service class on its Airbus A330-200 aircraft. The Economy Comfort seating offered seating space upgrades for passengers, along with improved soft-product offerings for passengers on international routes.

In October 2015, Hawaiian announced that it will be upgrading its business class seats from the standard recliner seats to 180-degree lie-flat seats on their A330 fleet in a 2-2-2 configuration. The new seats would be installed starting the second quarter of 2016. In addition to the new business class seats upgrade, the airline would add 28 additional Extra Comfort seats.

The Airbus A321neo cabin uses Hawaiian-inspired designs, utilizing and used a 3-3 configuration in the main cabin and a 2-2 configuration in business class.

In-flight entertainment 
Prior to September 1, 2013, Hawaiian offered DigEplayer portable video players for rent. Airbus A330 aircraft are equipped with on-demand units built into every seatback. The new Airbus A321neo is equipped with personal device entertainment via app. As of July 2019, all in-flight entertainment on mainland to Hawai'i flights is available, free of charge.

On April 25, 2022, Hawaiian announced an agreement with Starlink to provide free internet access for flights between the Hawai'i and the mainland, Asia, and Oceania on Airbus A330, A321neo, and upcoming Boeing 787-9 aircraft.

Catering 
Hawaiian provides complimentary and paid beverage service on all of its flights. Meals are not provided on interisland flights because of their short length (30–45 minutes). On its U.S. mainland flights, Hawaiian is one of the only major U.S. airlines to provide complimentary meals in its main cabin (coach class); each meal is made with no preservatives and with all-natural ingredients and is packaged with recyclable materials. In 2009, Hawaiian introduced premium meals in its main cabin, giving passengers the option of having the complimentary meal or paying to upgrade to a premium meal. The premium meals consisted of a variety of high-end Asian cuisine, but were later discontinued.

In March 2007, Hawaiian introduced a "tasting menu" or "tapas menu" for its first-class passengers on its U.S. mainland and international flights. The menu consists of twenty entrees set on a rotation, with five available on any given flight. Passengers are provided information on the available entrees for their flight when they board or shortly after takeoff, and may choose up to three entrees as part of their inflight meal.

In August 2012, Hawaiian announced an upgrade to its economy class in-flight U.S. mainland service. Among the upgrades were a new menu, a complimentary glass of wine on lunch or dinner flights, and a free tropical cocktail before landing on breakfast flights. This was in contrast to other airlines, which cut back on meal service. According to Hawaiian's then-CEO Mark Dunkerley:

"In today's competitive world you cannot justify providing complimentary meals on a traditional business model. It simply does not pay for itself... which explains why essentially everybody has taken all that free food off the airplane. We're being illogical by actually investing heavily in this area...It's part of who we are, and it's what makes us different from everybody else."
Starting December 1, 2017, guests in the main cabin on Hawaiian flights between Hawaiʻi and western U.S. gateway cities will be treated to complimentary meal service exclusively created for the airline's new Pau Hāna Café brand. The Pau Hāna Café, branded meals made exclusively for the airline, consists of a continental breakfast box for brunch and hot sandwich and side for lunch. Pau Hāna, a Hawaiian term for “finished work,” is a time to relax and unwind after a long workday. The meal service is followed by coffee and a sweet treat for dessert. A parting Mahalo service features the carrier's popular Kōloa Breeze cocktail, featuring Kōloa Rum from the Island of Kauaʻi, and the airline's signature Pau Hāna snack mix.

On December 20, 2017, a partnership was announced with Mana Up, the Hawaiian-based accelerator for local consumer packaged goods, to increase the diversity and volume of locally made products served on board.

Frequent-flyer program 

Hawaiian Airlines' frequent-flyer program is HawaiianMiles, which started in 1983. Miles accumulated in the program allow members to redeem tickets, upgrade service class or obtain free or discounted car rentals, hotel stays, merchandise, or other products and services through partners. The most active members, based on the amount and price of travel booked, are designated Pualani Gold (fly 30 Segments or fly 20,000 Flight Miles) and Pualani Platinum (fly 60 Segments or fly 40,000 Flight Miles), with privileges such as separate check-in, Premier Club Lounge access in Honolulu, Hilo, Kona, Kahului, and Līhuʻe, priority upgrade and standby processing, or complimentary upgrades. Travel award redemption from the HawaiianMiles program account for 5% of total revenue passengers.

Hawaiian also has frequent-flyer partnerships with several other airlines, allowing HawaiianMiles members to earn credit for flying partner airlines and/or members of partner airline frequent flyer programs to earn credit for Hawaiian flights. Some partnerships restrict credit to only certain flights, such as inter-island flights or to code-share flights booked through Hawaiian.

HawaiianMiles allows one-way redemption on Hawaiian Airlines flights only. Currently, the lowest-priced one-way economy class ticket is an inter-island coach saver flight for 7,500 miles. Prior to 2021, HawaiianMiles accounts with no activity for 18 months automatically expired. Hawaiian announced on April 12, 2021, that HawaiianMiles accounts would no longer have expiration dates, effective immediately.

Accidents and incidents 
 On December 23, 2000, a Hawaiian Airlines McDonnell Douglas DC-10 operating HA481 experienced a runway overrun at Faa'a International Airport in Papeete. An investigation determined that the incident was due to improper spoiler configuration and the flight crew's decision to land in a thunderstorm. There were no fatalities.
 On May 1, 2015, a Hawaiian Airlines Boeing 767 operating flight HA24 from Kahului Airport to Oakland, CA returned to the airport because of smoke in the cabin. The passengers were evacuated via the emergency slides. There were two minor injuries.
 On May 15, 2015, a Hawaiian Airlines Boeing 717 operating flight HA118 from Daniel K. Inouye International Airport to Kona International Airport started emitting smoke from one of its engines. It diverted to Kahului Airport, where it was met by fire engines that extinguished the fire. There were no fatalities and no evacuation was ordered.
 On August 13, 2018, a Hawaiian Airlines Airbus A321 operating flight HA56 experienced a tailstrike upon landing at Los Angeles. Of the 197 passengers aboard, there were no injuries.
 On August 22, 2019, an Airbus A321neo flying from Oakland to Honolulu (operated as flight HA47) made a successful landing at Honolulu after the cabin started filling with smoke. Seven people were hospitalized for smoke inhalation. There were no serious injuries among the 191 passengers and crew. Hawaiian Airlines stated that it believed that the incident was caused by a "faulty engine seal."
On December 18, 2022, an Airbus A330-200 (N393HA), operating flight HA35, encountered severe turbulence 30 minutes prior to landing in Honolulu from Phoenix, Arizona. 36 passengers were injured, 20 were taken to the hospital with 11 in serious condition.

See also 

 List of airlines of Hawaii
 Hana Hou!, Hawaiian's in-flight magazine
 Air transportation in the United States

Bibliography 
 Gradidge, J.M. The Convairliners story. 1997. Air-Britain (Historians) Ltd .
 Gradidge, Jennifer. ''DC-1, DC-2, DC-3 – The First Seventy Years. 2006. Air-Britain (Historians) Ltd. .

References

External links 

 

 
1929 establishments in Hawaii
Airlines established in 1929
Airlines for America members
Airlines based in Hawaii
American companies established in 1929
Companies that filed for Chapter 11 bankruptcy in 1993
Companies that filed for Chapter 11 bankruptcy in 2003
Companies based in Honolulu